Claire Chafee is an American playwright. Her 1993 play Why We Have a Body won an Oppenheimer Award.

References

Living people
20th-century American dramatists and playwrights
American women dramatists and playwrights
Year of birth missing (living people)
20th-century American women writers
21st-century American women